Westminster is an area within the City of Westminster, London, UK.

Westminster may also refer to:

Education
University of Westminster, London, U.D.
Westminster College of Chemistry and Pharmacy, a defunct College of Chemistry and Pharmacy in London, founded in 1841
Westminster Seminary California, a Reformed seminary in Escondido, California, U.S.
Westminster Theological Seminary, a Reformed seminary headquartered in Philadelphia, Pennsylvania, U.S.

Westminster Academy
Westminster Academy (Florida), Fort Lauderdale, Florida, U.S.
Westminster Academy, London, London, UK
Westminster Academy (Tennessee), Memphis, Tennessee, U.S.

Westminster Christian Academy
Westminster Christian Academy (Georgia), Watkinsville, Georgia, U.S.
Westminster Christian Academy (Louisiana), Opelousas, Louisiana, U.S.
Westminster Christian Academy (Missouri), St. Louis, Missouri, U.S.

Westminster College
City of Westminster College, London, U.K.
Westminster Choir College, in Princeton, New Jersey, U.S.
Westminster College (Utah), Salt Lake City, Utah, U.S.
Westminster College, Cambridge, U.K.
Westminster College, Oxford
former name of Wesley College (Mississippi), U.S.
Westminster College (Missouri), Fulton, Missouri, U.S.
Westminster College (Pennsylvania), U.S.
Westminster College, Texas, U.S.
Westminster Kingsway College, London, U.K.

Other schools
Westminster High School (disambiguation)
Westminster School (disambiguation)

Entertainment
"Westminster", a song written by James Montgomery and released on the Feldons' 2008 album A Cabinet of Human Oddities
Westminster Records, an American record label of the LP era
Westminster Review, a journal for philosophical radicals, was sometimes known simply as the Westminster

Government
Palace of Westminster, the home of the Houses of Parliament, Westminster, London
Westminster Hall, part of the Palace of Westminster, where the Court of King's Bench sat 1215–1665
Statute of Westminster (disambiguation), several laws
Westminster, a metonym for the Parliament and Government of the United Kingdom
Parliament of the United Kingdom (from 1800), the supreme legislative body of the United Kingdom, the Crown dependencies and overseas territories
Parliament of Great Britain (1707–1800), formed following the ratification of the Acts of Union by the Parliaments of England and Scotland
Westminster system, a parliamentary system of government modelled after the United Kingdom
Westminster (electoral district), a provincial electoral district in the Canadian province of British Columbia
Westminster District (federal electoral district) in the Canadian province of British Columbia
Westminster District (Metropolis), London, England

Parliamentary constituencies
Cities of London and Westminster (UK Parliament constituency) (1950– )
Westminster (UK Parliament constituency) (1545–1918)
Westminster Abbey (UK Parliament constituency) (1918–1950)
Westminster St George's (UK Parliament constituency)

People
Dean of Westminster, head of the chapter at Westminster Abbey
Matthew of Westminster, long regarded as the author of the Flores Historiarum, now thought never to have existed

Places

England
City of Westminster, since 1965 the name of the London Borough the district is within
Metropolitan Borough of Westminster, from 1899 to 1965 also called the "City of Westminster", London
Liberty of Westminster, administration prior to 1899 – also known as the "City and Liberties of Westminster", London
Westminster St Margaret and St John, an ancient parish in the City and Liberty of Westminster
Westminster, Ellesmere Port, suburb of the town of Ellesmere Port, Cheshire

South Africa
Westminster, Free State, a village

United States
Westminster, California, a city in Orange County
Westminster, Colorado, a home rule municipality in Adams and Jefferson counties
Westminster, Louisiana, a census-designated place in East Baton Rouge Parish
Westminster, Maryland, a city in Carroll County
Westminster, Massachusetts, a town in Worcester County
Westminster, Michigan, a ghost town in Grand Traverse County
Westminster, Ohio, an unincorporated community in Allen County
Westminster, South Carolina, a city in Oconee County
Westminster, Texas, an unincorporated community and census-designated place in Collin County
Westminster (town), Vermont, a town in Windham County
Westminster (village), Vermont, a village in Windham County
Westminster Historic District, historic center of Westminster, Maryland

Australia
Westminster, Western Australia, a suburb of Perth

Canada
Westminster, Ontario (disambiguation)
Westminster–Branson, a neighborhood in Toronto
New Westminster, historic capital of British Columbia
South Westminster, a neighbourhood of Whalley, Surrey

Religion
Roman Catholic Archdiocese of Westminster, an archdiocese of the Catholic Church in Westminster, London, United Kingdom
Archbishop of Westminster, the Roman Catholic Cardinal of Westminster
Synods of Westminster ecclesiastical councils held in Westminster
Westminster Abbey, in the district of Westminster, London
Westminster Assembly of 1643, appointed by the Long Parliament to restructure the Church of England
Westminster Confession of Faith, a Reformed confession of faith authored by this assembly
Westminster Shorter Catechism a Reformed catechism written by the Westminster Assembly
Westminster Larger Catechism, a Reformed catechism written by the Westminster Assembly
Westminster Cathedral, the Catholic Mother Church of England and Wales, also located within Westminster, London
Westminster Presbyterian Church (disambiguation), several churches that share the name
Westminster Seminary California, a Reformed seminary in Escondido, California, United States
Westminster Theological Seminary, a Reformed seminary headquartered in Philadelphia, Pennsylvania, United States

Transportation
Austin Westminster, a 1954 motor car
HMS Westminster (F237), a frigate of the Royal Navy
HMS Westminster (L40) (1918–1948), W-class destroyer of the Royal Navy
Westminster, a former yacht converted into commercial service
Westminster, the name of a steam locomotive built by Peckett and Sons of Bristol in 1914 as part of an order from the War Office,  currently under restoration at Northampton & Lamport Railway
Westland Westminster, British helicopter

Other uses
Chelsea and Westminster Hospital (1994– ), Chelsea, U.K.
Duke of Westminster, major landowner, originally in London and now worldwide
Duke of Westminster's Medal for Military Literature
Mount Westminster, a mountain in the Supporters Range
National Westminster Bank, a large retail and commercial bank in the U.K.
Westminster Bank, one of its predecessors
Westminster (Evanston, Illinois), an apartment building in Evanston, Illinois
Westminster (typeface), a font designed for Westminster Bank to be easily readable by machines on cheques.
Westminster Bridge, London, U.K.
Westminster Bubble or Village, a notion that MPs, peers, government workers and reporters live a life dominated by politics and know none of the concerns of normal life
Westminster Hospital (1719–1994), London, U.K.
Westminster Kennel Club Dog Show in New York City, U.S.
Westminster paedophile dossier, a dossier on paedophiles allegedly associated with the British government
Westminster Quarters, a tune that many clocks play on the hour
Westminster tube station, in central London, U.K.

See also
New Westminster, a city in the Canadian province of British Columbia; formerly the colonial capital (1858–71)
New Westminster (disambiguation)
Treaty of Westminster (disambiguation)
Westminster, Ontario (disambiguation)
Westminster Catechism (disambiguation)
Westminster Council (disambiguation)